Hypolipoproteinemia, hypolipidemia, or hypolipidaemia (British English) is a form of dyslipidemia that is defined by abnormally lowered levels of any or all lipids and/or lipoproteins in the blood.  It occurs through genetic disease (namely, hypoalphalipoproteinemia and hypobetalipoproteinemia), malnutrition, malabsorption, wasting disease, cancer, hyperthyroidism, and liver disease.

Causes
Causes of hypolipidemia include:
Hypobetalipoproteinemia (low levels of LDL cholesterol or apolipoprotein B)
Malnutrition
Malabsorption
Wasting disease
 Certain cancers
Hyperthyroidism (an overactive thyroid)
Liver disease

Diagnosis
It can be diagnosed via blood study that identifies fat particles. The patient must fast overnight to prevent interference from fat in the blood due to food intake. The criteria for this (without the involvement of cholesterol-lowering drugs) are total cholesterol levels below 120 mg/dL and LDL cholesterol levels under 50 mg/dL.

Critical illness
In the setting of critical illness, low cholesterol levels are predictive of clinical deterioration, and are correlated with altered cytokine levels.

In humans with genetic loss-of-function variants in one copy of the ANGPTL3 gene, the serum LDL-C levels are reduced. In those with loss-of-function variants in both copies of ANGPTL3, low LDL-C, low HDL-C, and low triglycerides are seen ("familial combined hypolipidemia").

Hooft disease is a rare condition evidenced by low blood lipid level, red rash and mental and physical retardation.

Treatment
Vitamin E supplements have shown to help children with the deficiency.

See also 
 Hypercholesterolemia
 Primary hyperlipoproteinemia
 ANGPTL3

References

External links 

Lipid disorders
Lipid metabolism disorders